Ronald Dale Barassi Jr.  (born 27 February 1936) is a former Australian rules footballer, coach and media personality. Regarded as one of the most important figures in the history of the game, Barassi was the first player to be inaugurated into the Australian Football Hall of Fame as a "Legend", and is one of three Australian rules footballers to be elevated to the same status in the Sport Australia Hall of Fame.

When Barassi was five years old, his father, Melbourne Football Club player Ron Barassi Sr., died in action at Tobruk during World War II. Barassi was determined to follow in his father's footsteps at Melbourne, and heavy lobbying by the club to recruit him resulted in the introduction of the father-son rule, still in use by the AFL. Barassi subsequently lived with Norm Smith, Melbourne's then-coach and a former teammate of his father. Under Smith's mentorship, Barassi pioneered the ruck rover position and appeared in six premiership-winning sides, two of which he captained. In 1964, in what has been called "the most audacious signing in league history", Barassi left Melbourne for a lucrative contract at Carlton. Retiring from playing in 1969, he coached Carlton to two premierships, including a record-breaking comeback in 1970 before what remains the largest crowd in football history; Barassi's famous half-time injunction to his men to play on from marks and handball at all costs came to be remembered as "the birth of modern football".

Barassi retired from professional football in 1971, but was lured back two years later to coach North Melbourne. In 1981, after leading the club to its first two premierships, he returned to an ailing Melbourne, where he initiated the "Irish experiment": the recruitment of Gaelic footballers into Australian rules. His stint at Melbourne, followed by another at the Sydney Swans in 1993–95, proved vital in rebuilding those clubs as viable members of the competition.

Barassi's coaching career was both successful and regarded by many as revolutionary. His clean record and passion for the game―exemplified by his campaigning for the establishment of a national club-level competition―has earned him a place as a celebrity and popular culture figure in Australia. He was named a Member of the Order of Australia in 1978, and in 1996 was selected in the AFL's Team of the Century as a ruck rover.

Early life

The only child of Ron Barassi, Sr., Barassi was born in the central Victorian town of Castlemaine in 1936. The following year, his father moved to Melbourne to play VFL football with the Melbourne Football Club. A pugnacious rover, Barassi's father was a reserve in the Demons' 1940 premiership team before leaving to serve with the army in North Africa. The young Barrasi spent his early years in Guildford, Victoria.

Barassi is a third generation Italian Australian. He is a descendant of one of the Swiss Italians of Australia who migrated to Australia in the 1850s and 1860s to areas such as Guildford, between Castlemaine and Daylesford.

Australian rules football career
Barassi unintentionally changed the game before he even took the field. After his father's death at Tobruk in 1941, a group of players and officials at the Melbourne Football Club pledged to support his widow, Elza, and her young son. As a teenager, Barassi was determined to follow in his father's footsteps at the Demons, but the zoning system of the day required him to play for either Collingwood or Carlton.

Father–son rule
To ensure he played with the Demons, Melbourne went to the VFL and successfully lobbied for the creation of a father–son rule to allow clubs preferential recruiting access to the sons of players who have made a major past contribution to the team. When the time came for Barassi to be signed up, Melbourne picked him up from Preston Scouts in 1952 and he became only the second player signed under the new rule. This rule, with some modifications and adapted to the drafting system created in 1986, endures to the present day in the AFL.

The club had gone to great lengths to recruit the young Barassi, and coach Norm Smith took him under his wing after his mother moved to Tasmania. Smith offered the sixteen-year-old use of his backyard bungalow. Looking back on the experience, Barassi believes that living with the man who was voted as the coach of the AFL's team of the century had a profound impact on his development. On his website, Barassi had this to say: "Norm Smith loved his footy. That suited me fine. His ability with young people, his strength of character, his ethics and values, came into my life at the right time.”Melbourne years

Melbourne Football Club was the dominant team of the 1950s. Under the coaching of Norm Smith, Barassi developed quickly. Barassi's first game was against Footscray in 1953 in which he was 'flattened' by Footscray's Charlie Sutton. Initially unsure as to Barassi's best position, Smith played him as a second ruckman in 1954, despite his lack of inches for the position. Barassi played more as a second rover, and the term "ruck rover" entered the football lexicon. Within a few years, most teams imitated this structure which ultimately paved the way for a new-style of quicker on-ball play.

Barassi soon proved himself as an influential footballer, and was quickly handed leadership responsibilities. In 1957 he was appointed vice-captain, and as captain three years later. After losing the 1954 Grand Final to a more experienced Footscray football team, the Demons dominated the VFL by winning flags in 1955-56-57 with a team hailed as the best to play the game. The image of Barassi breaking a tackle in the 1957 Grand Final is captured in Jamie Cooper's painting the Game That Made Australia, commissioned by the AFL in 2008 to celebrate the 150th anniversary of the sport

Carlton years
But a resurgent Carlton gave him a dilemma in 1964. New president George Harris was desperate to have Barassi at Princes Park, and was willing to offer a lucrative contract if Barassi would cross to Carlton as captain-coach. Carlton offered Barassi a chance to test his skills as coach with a professional wage which would help with his children’s education.

Barassi joined Carlton in 1965. On his decision to leave Melbourne, Barassi said that "Inevitably with many decisions in life there will be a downside. It is regrettable but you have to get on with things", he said.  "You have to ensure, as much as possible, that the decision you’ve made turns out right. Fortunately it worked out, and I’ll be forever grateful to Carlton for the start they gave me in coaching".

Barassi's coaching at Carlton brought them from their lowest ever VFL finish (at the time) to premiers only four years later.  Drawing from his own experience under Norm Smith, Barassi forced his squad to become more disciplined and committed to the club, and their career. He preached and played a tough brand of football, and asked his charges to play a selfless, team-oriented style.

In 1968, he guided Carlton to its first premiership in 21 years. In mid 1969, he retired from playing but continued as non-playing coach, and in 1970, in front of the biggest ever VFL crowd, he led Carlton to arguably football’s most famous comeback defeating Collingwood who were leading by 44 points at half-time.

After the 1971 season, Barassi left the Blues to focus on his business career. Despite not having played football since 1969, he signed to play with Port Melbourne in the Victorian Football Association in 1972, but he played only four games before suffering a hamstring injury and retiring.

North Melbourne years
Barassi returned to coaching in 1973.  With administrators Allen Aylett and Ron Joseph, he recruited a new batch of stars for North Melbourne.  Proven champions were recruited from clubs throughout the country, including Malcolm Blight, Barry Cable, John Rantall, Barry Davis and Doug Wade.

North Melbourne were to win the wooden spoon in 1972, finishing last.  In 1974, Barassi's second year of coaching, North Melbourne were to come runner up in the grand final. By 1975 they had won the premiership.  Barassi had implemented a tough training regime in 1974 which he modified for 1975 finals where he introduced lighter training sessions to keep his squad mentally focussed and not over trained and exhausted.

The Kangaroos went on to win another premiership in 1977, but it very nearly was not, as North Melbourne gave up a late lead against Collingwood in the second ever drawn VFL grand final. Barassi made major positional changes, placing David Dench into the forward line, which sparked off the club's comeback to get back in front, until Ross Dunne kicked a late goal to draw the game. Within a week, Barassi had picked his side up from this disappointment to lead North to a memorable triumph.

Return to Melbourne
In 1981 Barassi returned to Melbourne to assist long-term under 19 coach Ray 'Slug' Jordon. The under 19s made three straight grand finals and won premierships in 1981 and 1983.  Barassi laid some foundations for what would become a revitalised Melbourne side. "In the five years we were there I think we raised the level of the club quite substantially. Melbourne reached the preliminary final two years after we left, and the grand final the year after that. I felt we did some of the ground work".

He started the "Irish experiment" at Melbourne which started recruiting Gaelic footballers from Ireland and converting them to Australian rules footballers. He recruited the most famous of all, 1991 Brownlow Medallist, Jim Stynes.

Sydney years
In 1993, Barassi returned to coaching for the Sydney Swans. This was seen as a coup for the AFL given Barassi's media skills and profile. In his three seasons in Sydney, he raised the profile of Australian rules football and the Sydney Swans in the rugby league–dominated city.

Statistics
Playing statistics

|- style="background:#EAEAEA"
| scope="row" text-align:center | 1953
| 
| 31 || 6 || 0 ||  ||  ||  ||  ||  ||  || 0.0 ||  ||  ||  ||  ||  ||  || 0
|-
| scope="row" text-align:center | 1954
| 
| 31 || 14 || 12 ||  ||  ||  ||  ||  ||  || 0.9 ||  ||  ||  ||  ||  ||  || 0
|- style="background:#EAEAEA"
| scope="row" text-align:center | 1955
| 
| 31 || 19 || 18 ||  ||  ||  ||  ||  ||  || 0.9 ||  ||  ||  ||  ||  ||  || 0
|-
| scope="row" text-align:center | 1956
| 
| 31 || 19 || 27 ||  ||  ||  ||  ||  ||  || 1.4 ||  ||  ||  ||  ||  ||  || 13
|- style="background:#EAEAEA"
| scope="row" text-align:center | 1957
| 
| 31 || 21 || 30 ||  ||  ||  ||  ||  ||  || 1.4 ||  ||  ||  ||  ||  ||  || 3
|-
| scope="row" text-align:center | 1958
| 
| 31,2 || 18 || 44 ||  ||  ||  ||  ||  ||  || 2.4 ||  ||  ||  ||  ||  ||  || 5
|- style="background:#EAEAEA"
| scope="row" text-align:center | 1959
| 
| 31 || 18 || 46 ||  ||  ||  ||  ||  ||  || 2.6 ||  ||  ||  ||  ||  ||  || 1
|-
| scope="row" text-align:center | 1960
| 
| 31 || 18 || 21 ||  ||  ||  ||  ||  ||  || 1.2 ||  ||  ||  ||  ||  ||  || 3
|- style="background:#EAEAEA"
| scope="row" text-align:center | 1961
| 
| 31 || 19 || 19 ||  ||  ||  ||  ||  ||  || 1.0 ||  ||  ||  ||  ||  ||  || 10
|-
| scope="row" text-align:center | 1962
| 
| 31 || 17 || 21 ||  ||  ||  ||  ||  ||  || 1.2 ||  ||  ||  ||  ||  ||  || 6
|- style="background:#EAEAEA"
| scope="row" text-align:center | 1963
| 
| 31 || 17 || 32 ||  ||  ||  ||  ||  ||  || 1.9 ||  ||  ||  ||  ||  ||  || 10
|-
| scope="row" text-align:center | 1964
| 
| 31 || 17 || 25 ||  ||  ||  ||  ||  ||  || 1.4 ||  ||  ||  ||  ||  ||  || 10
|- style="background:#EAEAEA"
| scope="row" text-align:center | 1965
| 
| 31 || 11 || 6 || 13 || 201 || 81 || 282 || 61 ||  || 0.5 || 1.2 || 18.3 || 7.4 || 25.6 || 5.5 ||  || 5
|-
| scope="row" text-align:center | 1966
| 
| 31 || 8 || 11 || 6 || 149 || 54 || 203 || 42 ||  || 1.4 || 0.8 || 18.6 || 6.8 || 25.4 || 5.3 ||  || 3
|- style="background:#EAEAEA"
| scope="row" text-align:center | 1967
| 
| 31 || 20 || 14 || 21 || 301 || 168 || 469 || 77 ||  || 0.8 || 1.1 || 15.1 || 8.4 || 23.5 || 3.9 ||  || 3
|-
| scope="row" text-align:center | 1968
| 
| 31 || 10 || 3 || 8 || 118 || 47 || 165 || 32 ||  || 0.3 || 0.8 || 11.8 || 4.7 || 16.5 || 3.2 ||  || 0
|- style="background:#EAEAEA"
| scope="row" text-align:center | 1969
| 
| 31 || 1 || 0 || 3 || 8 || 3 || 11 || 3 ||  || 0.0 || 3.0 || 8.0 || 3.0 || 11.0 || 3.0 ||  || 0
|- class="sortbottom"
! colspan=3 | Career
! 254
! 330
! 51
! 777
! 353
! 1130
! 215
! 
! 1.3
! 1.0
! 15.5
! 7.1
! 22.6
! 4.3
! 
! 72
|}

Coaching statistics

|- style="background-color: #EAEAEA"
! scope="row" style="text-align:center; font-weight:normal" |1964
|style="text-align:center;"|
| 1 || 1 || 0 || 0 || 100.0% ||  || 12
|-
! scope="row" style="text-align:center; font-weight:normal" |1965
|style="text-align:center;"|
| 18 || 10 || 8 || 0 || 55.6% || 6 || 12
|- style="background-color: #EAEAEA"
! scope="row" style="text-align:center; font-weight:normal" |1966
|style="text-align:center;"|
| 18 || 10 || 8 || 0 || 55.6% || 6 || 12
|-
! scope="row" style="text-align:center; font-weight:normal" |1967
|style="text-align:center;"|
| 20 || 14 || 5 || 1 || 72.5% || 2 || 12
|- style="background-color: #EAEAEA"
! scope="row" style="text-align:center; font-weight:normal" |1968
|style="text-align:center;"|
| 22 || 17 || 5 || 0 || 77.3% || 2 || 12
|-
! scope="row" style="text-align:center; font-weight:normal" |1969
|style="text-align:center;"|
| 22 || 16 || 6 || 0 || 72.7% || 2 || 12
|- style="background-color: #EAEAEA"
! scope="row" style="text-align:center; font-weight:normal" |1970
|style="text-align:center;"|
| 25 || 18 || 7 || 0 || 72.0% || 2 || 12
|-
! scope="row" style="text-align:center; font-weight:normal" |1971
|style="text-align:center;"|
| 22 || 14 || 8 || 0 || 63.6% || 5 || 12
|- style="background-color: #EAEAEA"
! scope="row" style="text-align:center; font-weight:normal" |1973
|style="text-align:center;"|
| 22 || 11 || 10 || 1 || 52.3% || 6 || 12
|-
! scope="row" style="text-align:center; font-weight:normal" |1974
|style="text-align:center;"|
| 26 || 18 || 8 || 0 || 69.2% || 2 || 12
|- style="background-color: #EAEAEA"
! scope="row" style="text-align:center; font-weight:normal" |1975
|style="text-align:center;"|
| 26 || 17 || 9 || 0 || 65.4% || 3 || 12
|-
! scope="row" style="text-align:center; font-weight:normal" |1976
|style="text-align:center;"|
| 25 || 17 || 8 || 0 || 68.0% || 3 || 12
|- style="background-color: #EAEAEA"
! scope="row" style="text-align:center; font-weight:normal" |1977
|style="text-align:center;"|
| 26 || 18 || 7 || 1 || 71.2% || 3 || 12
|-
! scope="row" style="text-align:center; font-weight:normal" |1978
|style="text-align:center;"|
|  25 || 17 || 8 || 0 || 68.0% || 1 || 12
|- style="background-color: #EAEAEA"
! scope="row" style="text-align:center; font-weight:normal" |1979
|style="text-align:center;"|
| 25 || 18 || 7 || 0 || 72.0% || 2 || 12
|-
! scope="row" style="text-align:center; font-weight:normal" |1980
|style="text-align:center;"|
| 23 || 14 || 8 || 1 || 63.0% || 6 || 12
|- style="background-color: #EAEAEA"
! scope="row" style="text-align:center; font-weight:normal" |1981
|style="text-align:center;"|
| 22 || 1 || 21 || 0 || 4.6% || 12 || 12
|-
! scope="row" style="text-align:center; font-weight:normal" |1982
|style="text-align:center;"|
| 22 || 8 || 14 || 0 || 36.4% || 8 || 12
|- style="background-color: #EAEAEA"
! scope="row" style="text-align:center; font-weight:normal" |1983
|style="text-align:center;"|
| 22 || 9 || 13 || 0 || 40.9% || 8 || 12
|-
! scope="row" style="text-align:center; font-weight:normal" |1984
|style="text-align:center;"|
| 22 || 9 || 13 || 0 || 40.9% || 9 || 12
|- style="background-color: #EAEAEA"
! scope="row" style="text-align:center; font-weight:normal" |1985
|style="text-align:center;"|
| 22 || 6 || 16 || 0 || 27.3% || 11 || 12
|-
! scope="row" style="text-align:center; font-weight:normal" |1993
|style="text-align:center;"|
| 15 || 1 || 14 || 0 || 6.7% || 15 || 15
|- style="background-color: #EAEAEA"
! scope="row" style="text-align:center; font-weight:normal" |1994
|style="text-align:center;"|
| 22 || 4 || 18 || 0 || 18.2% || 15 || 15
|-
! scope="row" style="text-align:center; font-weight:normal" |1995
|style="text-align:center;"|
| 22 || 8 || 14 || 0 || 36.4% || 12 || 16
|- class="sortbottom"
! colspan=2| Career totals
! 515
! 276
! 235
! 4
! 53.4%
! colspan=2|
|}

Career highlights
Melbourne premiership player 1955, 1956, 1957, 1959, 1960, 1964
Melbourne leading goalkicker 1958 (eq), 1959
Melbourne Captain 1960–1964
Melbourne Best and Fairest 1961, 1964
All Australian 1956, 1958, 1961
Playing coach representing Australia in "The Galahs" Australian Football World Tour 1968
Carlton premiership coach 1968, 1970
North Melbourne premiership coach 1975, 1977
Australian Football Hall of Fame
 AFL Legend
 VFL/AFL Team of the Century
Sport Australia Hall of Fame (2006)
 VFL/AFL Italian Team of the Century (coach) 2007

Personal life
On 4 March 1957, Barassi married Nancy Kellett, who he had met at work four years earlier. They settled in the eastern suburbs of Melbourne, at Heathmont, and had three children: Susan (born 29 July 1960), Ron (born 23 June 1962) and Richard (born 13 February 1964). The couple separated in 1975 and Barassi married Cherryl Copeland in 1981. During his coaching career at North Melbourne he survived a car crash, which caused life-threatening injuries and resulted in the loss of his spleen. His passenger, former St Kilda player and Brownlow medallist Neil Roberts, was also hurt. Barassi used a motorised buggy and a wheelchair for a short time. Despite this setback, he attended training nights at Arden Street and could be seen directing players with assistants.

Barassi's first trip overseas occurred in 1961.  He has since travelled much of the world. In 1967 in New York City during the Australian Football World Tour, Barassi was involved in a fight in which detective Brendan Tumelty broke Barassi's nose and both were sent to the same hospital.  They have been friends since.

Barassi moved to the suburb of St Kilda in the late 1970s and has lived there ever since.

For many years, Barassi owned the Mountain View Hotel at 70 Bridge Road in Richmond.

For his 70th birthday he did a trek of the Kokoda Trail in Papua New Guinea.

On 28 February 2008, Barassi launched and signed his book Barassi, focusing on his personal life and scrapbook memoirs.

On New Year's Eve 2008, Barassi was assaulted when he went to the aid of a young woman in St Kilda. Barassi, dining with friends, saw a woman punched to the ground around 12.30 am.

Public life

Since retiring from football coaching, Barassi remains a prominent Australian rules football celebrity and a figure of popular culture.

In 1996, he became an inaugural inductee in the Australian Football Hall of Fame, one of few former greats to be bestowed the honour of the Legend category. He is also one of only three Australian rules footballers in the Sport Australia Hall of Fame, alongside Leigh Matthews and Ted Whitten.

He has also been involved in grassroots football development and has been an advocate for the development of the game internationally, particularly in South Africa. Reflecting this, Barassi has lent his name to the Barassi International Australian Football Youth Tournament.

He is a supporter of Australia becoming a republic.

More recently, he was one of the last runners in the Queen's Baton Relay for the 2006 Commonwealth Games, being held in Melbourne, Australia between 15 and 26 March. His section of the relay, run on 15 March, involved taking the Baton from a series of pontoons in the middle of the Yarra River onto shore. It was handed to him by David Neitz, captain of the Melbourne Football Club (the team with which Barassi has been long associated). This was accomplished by having Barassi walk on a pontoon that was submerged just beneath the surface of the water, giving the impression that Barassi was 'walking on water'.

Barassi is the namesake of the Barassi Line, a concept originated by scholar Ian Turner to describe the geographical divide in Australia between Australian rules football and the two rugby codes. The line is imagined to intersect the border towns of Corowa and Wahgunyah, where, in 2014, Barassi attended the unveiling of a plaque commemorating the Barassi Line.

Robert Helpmann's 1964 ballet The Display includes a lengthy football sequence for which Helpmann recruited Barassi to coach the male dancers in Australian rules. Barassi wrote the introduction to Philip Hodgins' 1990 poetry collection A Kick of the Footy. The frontman of satirical Melbourne band TISM went under the pseudonym Ron Hitler-Barassi. Barassi disliked the reference, saying "My father was killed by Hitler's men in Tobruk so you can imagine my displeasure." Artist Lewis Miller won the 2000 "Sporting Archibald" for his portrait of Barassi, which was acquired by the National Portrait Gallery in Canberra. Barassi has appeared in the Specky Magee books. In 2015, Barassi collaborated with singer-songwriter Tex Perkins on the song "One Minute's Silence", a tribute to the diggers who died at Gallipoli. He was mentioned several times in episodes of the television show Kingswood Country. He was one of the first footballers to have his own football clinic on television and during the 1960s he also launched his popular "Ron Barassi" footy boots.

After the second week of the 2006 AFL Finals, with the four remaining teams all being non-Victorian, with Victorians reeling from their recent weakness, Barassi controversially called for an inquiry to unearth the reason Victoria was trailing in the AFL, despite the state giving birth to the national competition.

In late 2006, he became a Sport Australia Hall of Fame member.

The best player in the Under 17 International Rules Series is awarded the Ron Barassi Medal.

Barassi was the subject of a series 2 episode of Who Do You Think You Are?.

In 2012 Australian playwright Tee O'Neill adapted Barassi's life into a theatrical performance. The play script was published by Currency Press.

Honours and awards

Publications
 Icons of Australian Sport: Ron Barassi - Chronicling His Football Career Using His Scrapbooks and Memorabilia (2008)
 Barassi: The Biography (2010)
 Life lessons from an Australian legend (2011)

References

External links

 
 
 
 
 Ron Barassi's Personal Website
 Interview – An interview conducted by George Negus for the ABC-TV programme George Negus Tonight''
 

1936 births
Living people
People from Castlemaine, Victoria
Australian rules footballers from Melbourne
Australian people of Italian descent
Sportspeople of Italian descent
Australian people of Swiss-Italian descent
Melbourne Football Club players
Carlton Football Club players
Port Melbourne Football Club players
Melbourne Football Club captains
Melbourne Football Club coaches
Carlton Football Club coaches
Carlton Football Club Premiership coaches
North Melbourne Football Club coaches
North Melbourne Football Club Premiership coaches
Sydney Swans coaches
All-Australians (1953–1988)
Australian Football Hall of Fame inductees
Keith 'Bluey' Truscott Trophy winners
Australian republicans
Members of the Order of Australia
Recipients of the Australian Sports Medal
Sport Australia Hall of Fame inductees
Six-time VFL/AFL Premiership players
Four-time VFL/AFL Premiership coaches
Melbourne Football Club Premiership players